Acetylated distarch adipate (E1422), is a starch that is treated with acetic anhydride and adipic acid anhydride to resist high temperatures.  It is used in foods as a bulking agent, stabilizer and a thickener.

No acceptable daily intake for human consumption has been determined.

See also
Dextrin (E1400)
Modified starch

References

External links
FAO/WHO Food Standards

Starch
Food additives
Edible thickening agents
Adipate esters
E-number additives